Lilli Ann was a clothing company that was started in San Francisco, California in 1934 by Adolph Schuman, and named for his wife Lillian. Throughout the 1940s and 1950s, the company was known for its good workmanship and high-quality fabrics.

References 

"Adolph Schuman Dies at 73; Was Apparel Maker on Coast" UPI, The New York Times, October 2, 1985, retrieved August 1, 2006

Clothing brands of the United States
1934 establishments in California